The Swedish Accident Investigation Authority (in English formerly the Swedish Accident Investigation Board) is a Swedish government agency tasked with investigating all types of serious civil or military accidents that can occur on land, on the sea or in the air. Incidents are also to be investigated if there was a serious risk of an accident. Its headquarters are in Stockholm.

Directors General
Directors General:
1978-07-01 – 1987-06-30 – Göran Steen
1987-07-01 – 1997-05-29 – Olof Forssberg
1997-05-30 – 1997-06-08 – S-E Sigfridsson (acting)
1997-06-09 – 2002-01-06 – Ann-Louise Eksborg
2002-01-07 – 2004-01-31 – Lena Svenaeus
2004-02-01 – 2004-05-31 – Carin Hellner (acting)
2004-04-01 – 2011-04-17 – Åsa Kastman Heuman
2011-04-18 – 2020-05-01 – Hans Ytterberg
2020-05-01 – present – John Ahlberk

Notable investigations 
 Scandinavian Airlines Flight 751 (1991)
 M/S Estonia (1994)
 Falsterbo Swedish Coast Guard C-212 crash (2006)
 MV Finnbirch (2006)
 Norwegian Air Force C-130 crash (2012)
 Saltsjöbanan train crash (2013)
 West Air Sweden Flight 294 (2016)
 Skydive Umeå Gippsland GA8 Airvan crash (2019)

See also 
 Swedish Civil Aviation Administration
 Swedish Maritime Administration

References

External links 
  
  

Rail accident investigators
Organizations investigating aviation accidents and incidents
Aviation in Sweden
Automotive safety
Safety organizations
Accident Investigation Board
Transport organizations based in Sweden
Transport safety organizations